Presidential Council may refer to:
Presidential Council (Benin)
Presidential Council of the People's Republic of Hungary
Presidential Council of Iran
Presidency Council of Iraq
Presidential Council (Libya)
Presidential Council (South Yemen)
Presidential Council of the Soviet Union
Presidential Council (Turkey)
Presidential Leadership Council in Yemen, created in 2022
Andean Presidential Council, part of the Andean Community of Nations